Bal is a given name.  People with the given name include:

 Bal Bahadur K.C. (born 1953), Nepali politician
 Bal Dani (1933–1999), Indian cricketer
 Bal David (born 1972), Filipino basketball player
 Bal Dhuri, Indian theatre actor
 Bal Dixit, American businessman
 Bal Gosal (born 1960), Canadian politician
 Bal Kadbet (1925–2010), Indian cricketer
 Bal Kudtarkar, Indian radio personality
 Bal Narsingh Kunwar (1783–1841), Nepalese Kaji and governor
 Bal Gopal Maharjan, Nepali football coach
 Bal Chandra Misra, Indian politician
 Bal Ram Nanda (1917–2010), Indian writer
 Bal Raj Nijhawan (1915–2014), Indian metallurgist
 Bal Pandit (1929–2015), Indian cricketer, writer and broadcaster
 Bal Kumar Patel (born 1964), India politician
 Bal Phondke (born 1939), Indian writer
 Bal Bahadur Rai (1921–2010), Nepali politician
 Bal Gopal Shrestha, Nepali cultural anthropologist
 Bal Krishna Singh (born 1916), Indian politician
 Bal Thackeray (1926-2012), Indian politician
 Bal Gangadhar Tilak (1856–1920), Indian nationalist, social reformer and freedom fighter